Leyner is an unincorporated community and a census-designated place (CDP) located in and governed by Boulder County, Colorado, United States. The CDP is a part of the Boulder, CO Metropolitan Statistical Area. The population of the Leyner CDP was 29 at the United States Census 2010. The Lafayette post office (Zip Code 80026) serves the area.

Geography
Boulder Creek forms the northern edge of the CDP.

History
A rail line was built through the Leyner area in the early 1870s by the Denver & Boulder Valley Railroad, connecting Boulder and Brighton. The D&BV was acquired by the Union Pacific Railroad in 1898. Leyner does not appear on topographic maps until 1951, and it was adjacent to a siding, indicating that it was probably a railway station at some point in history.

The rail line has been owned since 2009 by the Regional Transportation District.

Demographics

See also

Outline of Colorado
Index of Colorado-related articles
State of Colorado
Colorado cities and towns
Colorado census designated places
Colorado counties
Boulder County, Colorado
Colorado metropolitan areas
Front Range Urban Corridor
North Central Colorado Urban Area
Denver-Aurora-Boulder, CO Combined Statistical Area
Boulder, CO Metropolitan Statistical Area

References

External links

Boulder County website

Census-designated places in Boulder County, Colorado
Census-designated places in Colorado
Denver metropolitan area